Family Circus Maximus is a play produced by The Second City in Toronto.  It won the 2002 Canadian Comedy Award for Best Comedic Play.

References

Canadian plays
Comedy plays
Canadian Comedy Award winners